Sahhas is a 1981 Indian Hindi-language action film directed by Ravikant Nagaich, starring Mithun Chakraborty, Rati Agnihotri, Shakti Kapoor, Sharat Saxena, and Jagdeep.

Plot
This is the story of police officer Kishanchand who fights against drug mafias.

Cast

Mithun Chakraborty as Kishanchand
Rati Agnihotri as Radha
Madan Puri as Jagan
Shakti Kapoor as Billa
Sharat Saxena as Ajay Kumar
Jagdeep
Kalpana Iyer
Prema Narayan
Goga Kapoor
Satyen Kappu

Soundtrack 
All songs are composed by Bappi Lahiri.

References

External links
 

1981 films
1980s Hindi-language films
Films scored by Bappi Lahiri
Indian action films
Films directed by Ravikant Nagaich